The Al Maktoum Challenge, Round 1, is a horse race run over a distance of 1,600 metres (1 mile) in January on dirt at Meydan Racecourse in Dubai. It is the first of three races in the Al Maktoum Challenge series which serve as trial races for the Dubai World Cup.

It was first run in 1994 on dirt at Nad Al Sheba Racecourse. It was transferred to Meydan in 2010 where it was run on the synthetic Tapeta Footings surface. In 2015 the synthetic surface at Meydan was replaced by a dirt track.

The race began as an ungraded stakes race before attaining Listed status in 1996. The race was elevated to Group 3 level in 2002 and became a Group 2 event in 2013.

Records
Record time:
1:35.48 - Spindrift (1999)

Most wins by a horse:
 2 - Le Bernardin (2016, 2017)

Most wins by a jockey:
 4 - Frankie Dettori (1996, 1997, 2009, 2011)

Most wins by a trainer:
 8 - Saeed bin Suroor (1996, 1997, 1999, 2000, 2001, 2009, 2011, 2014)

Most wins by an owner:
 6 - Godolphin Racing (1995, 1996, 1997, 2001, 2009, 2014)

Winners

See also
 List of United Arab Emirates horse races

References

Racing Post:

Horse races in the United Arab Emirates
Recurring sporting events established in 1994
Nad Al Sheba Racecourse
1994 establishments in the United Arab Emirates